Bruno Toniolli (born 29 August 1943) is a retired Italian speed skater who was active internationally between 1969 and 1976. He competed at the 1972 and 1976 Winter Olympics with the best result of 14th place in the 1000 m in 1976.

References

1943 births
Living people
Italian male speed skaters
Speed skaters at the 1972 Winter Olympics
Speed skaters at the 1976 Winter Olympics
Olympic speed skaters of Italy
Sportspeople from Bolzano
20th-century Italian people
21st-century Italian people